William Henry Davies (c. 1892 – 25 October 1967) was an English professional golfer. He finished in the top 10 in the Open Championship four times. He played in the 1931 and 1933 Ryder Cups.

Golf career
Prior to World War I, Davies was professional at Hooton Park Golf Club. He entered the 1913 Open Championship at Hoylake but failed to qualify. In September that year, he reached the final stages of the News of the World Matchplay, finishing 5th in the northern section qualifying, although he lost 2&1 to Fred Leach in the first round. He won £5 for reaching the final stage.

In 1914 he won the 6th Liverpool and District Professional Championship at Leasowe Golf Club. He tied with H Cadwell on 148 but won the playoff the following day 147 to 150, winning £10 and a gold medal.

During the war he was in the Denbighshire Hussars.

After the war, he was professional at Bromborough Golf Club and then at Prenton Golf Club from 1924. In 1928 he became professional at Wallasey Golf Club in succession to Bob Kirk, Jr. He remained there until his retirement in 1964. He died on 25 October 1967 at Moreton, Cheshire.

Professional wins
1914 Liverpool and District Professional Championship
1928 Ryder Tournament (joint winner with Abe Mitchell)
1931 Leeds Cup, Northern Professional Championship
1933 Dunlop-Southport Tournament
1935 Northern Professional Championship
1939 Leeds Cup

Results in major championships

Note: Davies only played in the U.S. Open and The Open Championship.

NT = No tournament
CUT = missed the half-way cut
"T" indicates a tie for a place

Team appearances
Ryder Cup (representing Great Britain): 1931, 1933 (winners)
England–Scotland Professional Match (representing England): 1932 (winners), 1933 (winners)
England–Ireland Professional Match (representing England): 1932 (winners), 1933 (winners)

References

English male golfers
Ryder Cup competitors for Europe
People from Hoylake
English people of Welsh descent
1890s births
1967 deaths